Nireas Lamias is an aquatic sports club, founded in 1998, in Lamia, Greece. As of the 2013-2014 season, the club participates in the A1 Division replacing NO Chania, which withdrew from the championship. In the 2014-15 season Nireas Lamias was relegated to A2 Ethniki.

Recent seasons

References

External links
Nireas Lamias official website

Water polo clubs in Greece
Lamia (city)
1998 establishments in Greece
Sports clubs established in 1998